The following is a list of the lieutenant governors of Saskatchewan. Though the present day office of the Lieutenant Governor in Saskatchewan came into being only upon the province's entry into Canadian Confederation in 1905, the post is a continuation from the first Governorship of the Northwest Territories in 1869.

Lieutenant governors of Saskatchewan, 1905–present

See also
 Office-holders of Canada
 Canadian incumbents by year

External links
 

Saskatchewan
Monarchy in Canada
Lieutenant governors